Glendollagh Lough, also known as Garrowman Lough, is a freshwater lake in the west of Ireland. It is located in the Connemara area of County Galway.

Geography and natural history
The lake is part of the Connemara Bog Complex Special Area of Conservation.

See also
List of loughs in Ireland

References

Glendollagh